Machozetus is a genus of beetles in the family Carabidae, containing the following species:

 Machozetus concinnus C.A. Daohrn, 1885
 Machozetus lehmanni Menetries, 1848

References

Harpalinae